Belarusian Americans are Americans who are of total or partial Belarusian ancestry.

History 
There is an assumption that the first Belarusian settlers in the United States, who settled there at the beginning of the 17th century in Virginia, could have been brought as Slavic slaves by Captain John Smith, who visited Belarus in 1603. The first wave of mass emigration from Belarus started in the final decades of the nineteenth century and continued until World War I. They emigrated to the United States via Libava (Liepāja, Latvia) and northern Germany. When they arrived, most settled in New York, Philadelphia, Boston, and Baltimore. However, most of these first Belarusians were registered either as Russians (those who were Orthodox Christians) or as Poles (Roman Catholics). This was because the first wave of immigrants came before the full development and spread of Belarusian nationalism. Most ethnic Belarusians (those who were not genetically or culturally Polish, Lithuanian, or Jewish) considered themselves to be Russian. Furthermore, even today, those who descend from pre-World War I immigrants often use the more archaic term "White Russian" to describe their ancestry instead of "Belarusian".

Demography 

According to the 1990 US Census, only 4,277 respondents claimed Belarusian ancestry; there are no reports as to the estimated population from the 2000 census. The precise number of Belarusian Americans is difficult to determine, as census and immigration statistics did not historically recognize Belarusians as a separate category, as the Belarus was for a time part of the Russian Empire and then the Soviet Union when early immigrants arrived. Many of them were recorded as Russian or Polish, depending on the region of Belarus where they were born. The majority of the pre-Revolutionary immigrants from Belarus who were ethnic Belarusians identified as Russian, more or less holding Russophillic or Westrussianist views. A large portion of the Russian American community consisted of immigrants from Belarus. Belarus had, and still has, a Polish minority consisting of ethnic Poles, the descendants of the Polish nobility and gentry, as well as descendants of Polonized Belarusian peasants. In addition, the term "Belarusian" only became common near the end of the Soviet Union's existence, and most persons of Belarusian ancestry in the United States would be unaware of the term, referring to themselves as "White Russian" rather than "Belarusian".

Since it was customary in American English of that time to use a historical Ruthenian designation for various East Slavic peoples, Belarusians in the USA were sometimes referred to as White Ruthenians, and their first newspaper, Belaruskaja trybuna, that was published since 1926 by the Whiteruthenian National Association, had an English subtitle: Whiteruthenian Tribune.

The largest concentrations of Belarusian Americans are in the metropolitan New York area, New Jersey (especially Highland Park and South River), Cleveland (and its suburbs), Chicago (recent immigrants concentrated around Wheeling), Los Angeles, Sacramento (largely around Orangevale and North Highlands) and Detroit.

There were several waves of Belarusian influx into the US, one before the Russian Revolution, then in 1919-1939 from Western Belarus, then in the late 1940s-early 1950s (after the Second World War), and after the collapse of the USSR in the 1990s.

One major group of Belarusian immigrants to the U.S. are Belarusian Jews who migrated starting in the mid-19th century, having faced discrimination in the Russian Empire, which Belarus was part of at the time.

According to the 2000 Census Bureau report, 38,505 people who were born in Belarus lived in the USA. 1,363 of them spoke the Belarusian language at home.

Belarusian-born population
Belarusian-born population in the US since 2010:

Education and culture
There are several organizations in the United States that have developed a system of secondary schools in places with communities of Belarusian descent. These organizations have the goal of teaching the language, culture, and religious traditions of Belarus. Thus the Belarusian culture is represented by choirs, theatrical groups, and musical and dance ensembles. One of the more prominent associations is the Belarusan American Association.
Red, white, black and green colours dominate in the national costume. The national costumes differ depending on the region of Belarus. In the 1950s the St. Euphrosynia Belarusian Orthodox Church was created in South River, New Jersey.

Cuisine
Belarusian cuisine has left a trace in the life of the Americans. One of the proofs is the traditional bagel. The Americans also know Belarusian pierogi, kielbasy and cabbages. The Belarusian cuisine is dominated by various grains, potatoes, beef, pork and mushrooms. Actually, many dishes are cooked from potatoes; for example, draniki, babka, etc.  There are also dishes similar to the ones of neighbouring countries (Lithuania, Latvia, Russia, Poland): cabbage rolls, bortsch, cold beetroot soup or meat jelly.

Notable people

 Larry Brown
 Larry King
 Mary Antin
 Irving Berlin
 Dick Dale
 Kirk Douglas
 Harrison Ford
 Al Franken
 Alex Galchenyuk
 Wayne Gretzky
 Scarlett Johansson
 Olga Korbut
 Tadeusz Kościuszko
 Lisa Kudrow
 Jared Kushner
 George de Mohrenschildt
 Siarhei Navumchyk
 Dasha Nekrasova
 Gwyneth Paltrow
 Zianon Pazniak
 Greg Puciato
 Dmitry Sholokhov
 Nikolai Sudzilovsky
 Jazep Varonka
 Gary Vaynerchuk
 Jurka Vićbič
 Marianne Williamson
 Jan Zaprudnik
 Zebbler

See also 

Belarusian Americans in New York City
Belarus–United States relations

References

Sources

External links
Belarusian Youth Movement of America
The Belarusan-American Association
The international seminar Belarusian Diaspora: Past and Present took place in Minsk

 
European-American society
 
Belarusian diaspora in North America